Smash Childhood Cancer is a World Community Grid volunteer computing subproject on the BOINC platform.  It is based on World Community Grid's Help Childhood Cancer subproject which was a joint effort of Chiba University and the Chiba Cancer Center. Based on the results of that project, the Smash Childhood Cancer started in January 2017 looking for drug candidates targeting additional childhood cancers.

Project Purpose
Neuroblastoma is the most common type of solid tumor which afflicts children.  Three different proteins have been implicated in the production of neuroblastoma.  If these proteins can be disabled, conventional treatments would be much more effective.  Medicinal chemists have identified three million different molecules which might disable the proteins.  Treating it as a problem in ligand docking, a computer program called AutoDock will virtually attempt to fit each molecule to each protein in such a way that the protein is disabled.

See also
 BOINC
 List of volunteer computing projects
 World Community Grid
 Band of Parents
 The Neuroblastoma Society
 Neuroblastoma Children's Cancer Alliance UK

References

External links
Help Fight Childhood Cancer official site
Help Fight Childhood Cancer, World Community Grid

Volunteer computing projects
Science in society
Free science software
Cheminformatics
Computational chemistry
Cancer organizations based in Japan
Berkeley Open Infrastructure for Network Computing projects